Bayside may refer:

United States

Bayside, California
Bayside High School (disambiguation), several schools in the U.S. and Canada
Bayside Marketplace, Miami, Florida
Bayside Historic District, a sub-neighborhood of the Belle Meade neighborhood of Upper Eastside, Miami, Florida
Bayside (Jeanerette, Louisiana), listed on the NRHP in Louisiana
Bayside Historic District (Northport, Maine), listed on the NRHP in Maine
Bayside, Maine, a residential zone in Northport, Maine
Bayside, a neighborhood in Portland, Maine
Bayside, Queens, New York, a neighborhood in New York City
Bayside (LIRR station), rail station in Queens
Bayside, Texas
Bayside, Accomack County, Virginia
Bayside, Virginia Beach, Virginia
Bayside, Westmoreland County, Virginia
Bayside, Wisconsin

Canada 
Bayside, New Brunswick
Bayside, Nova Scotia
Bayside, Ontario

Other places 
Bayside Comprehensive School, Gibraltar
Bayside, Dublin, in Ireland
City of Bayside, in the Australian State of Victoria, in the suburbs of Melbourne
Bayside Council, a local government area in New South Wales, Australia

Other uses 
Bayside (album), by Bayside
Bayside (band), an American punk rock band
Gav-Yam, also known as Bayside Land Corporation, and Israeli real estate company
 A purported Marian Apparation debunked by the Roman Catholic church, first reported by Veronica Lueken
 A fictional county in the movie The Legend of Billie Jean.